Aneta Kulichová is a retired Czech football defender, who played for Slavia Prague in the Czech First Division.

Kulichová has played for the Czech national team. She made her debut for the national team on 3 June 2011 in a match against Nigeria.

References

1991 births
Living people
Czech women's footballers
Czech Republic women's international footballers
People from Nymburk
Women's association football defenders
SK Slavia Praha (women) players
Czech Women's First League players
Sportspeople from the Central Bohemian Region